Liberty Union High School is a public high school in Baltimore, Ohio.  It is the only high school in the Liberty Union-Thurston Local Schools district.  Their teams' name is the Lions.  The school colors are red and black.

The current high school was built in 1988 as an addition to be used as the middle school which has recently been torn down to make more parking spaces for students and teachers. The new middle school was built in 2011. The original Liberty Union High School was built in 1917, merging Baltimore and Basil High Schools.

Liberty Union Band
In recent history, the Liberty Union Band program has achieved numerous honors, at both the local and state level. In 2007, under the direction of Mr. Ben Factor, the Liberty Union Marching Band qualified for OMEA State Marching Band Finals for the first time in school history.

The Liberty Union High School Concert Band has consistently been rated Superior at District and State Adjudicated Events. The Concert Band has performed in Ohio Music Education Association "Class B" since 2011.

Ohio High School Athletic Association State Championships

 Boys Baseball – 1960, 1961, 1964
 Girls Track and Field – 1988
 Girls Basketball – 1993

Eastland-Fairfield Career & Technical School

Notable alumni
Clint Stickdorn, American football player

External links
 District Website
 School Report Cards from ODE

Notes and references

High schools in Fairfield County, Ohio
School buildings completed in 1988
Public high schools in Ohio